The Perfect Couple (aka The Best Romance) is a 2007 South Korean film.

Plot 
While eating skewered tempura at a street vendor, young reporter Choi Soo-jin accidentally sticks the skewer into the side of a detective, Kang Jae-hyuk, who was chasing a suspected criminal. After this encounter, Soo-jin is told to work on a story about a detective, and the detective turns out to be Jae-hyuk. Soo-jin joins his crackdown on drug dealers, and the two start to fall in love.

Cast 
 Lee Dong-wook as Kang Jae-hyuk
 Hyun Young as Choi Soo-jin
 Lee Jeong-heon
 Jeon Soo-kyung
 Kim Jung-heon as Handsome boy
 Jeong Jae-jin
 Kim Jae-man
 Kim Seung-min
 Joo Seok-tae
 Lee Myeong-jin
 Jang Hyun-sung (cameo)

Release 
The Perfect Couple was released in South Korea on 25 January 2007, and topped the box office on its opening weekend with 380,933 admissions. It went on to receive a total of 1,299,274 admissions nationwide, with a gross (as of 18 March 2007) of $7,228,471.

References

External links 
 http://thebest.showbox.co.kr/
 
 

2007 films
2000s Korean-language films
South Korean romantic comedy films
Showbox films
2000s South Korean films